Lavender Peak is a mountain peak in northwestern British Columbia, Canada.

References

Two-thousanders of British Columbia
Boundary Ranges
Cassiar Land District